Perfect Alibi is a 1995 American crime film directed by Kevin Meyer and starring Teri Garr and Hector Elizondo. It is based on the 1990 novel Where's Mommy Now? by Rochelle Majer Krich.

Plot
An adulterous husband and a homicidal French nanny seek to murder his rich wife for her money. The wife's best friend and a police detective attempt to bring the culprits to justice.

During the film's conclusion, the nanny attempts to poison her opponent's hot cocoa. However, the woman apparently switches the drinks, which gradually leads to the truth being revealed.

References

External links

1995 films
1995 crime films
Films based on American novels
Adultery in films
Uxoricide in fiction
1990s English-language films
American crime films
1990s American films